Phil Hansen may refer to:
 Phil Hansen (artist) (born 1979), American artist
 Phil Hansen (American football) (born 1968), retired player of American football and Republican candidate for State Senate in Minnesota in 2012
 Phil L. Hansen (1923–1992), Attorney General of Utah

See also
 Philip Hanson (civil servant) (1871–1955), British civil servant
Philip Hanson (racing driver)